Doriprismatica kyanomarginata is a species of sea slug, a dorid nudibranch, a shell-less marine gastropod mollusk in the family Chromodorididae.

Distribution 
This species was described from Egypt with additional material from The Creek, Jeddah, Saudi Arabia.

Description
Doriprismatica kyanomarginata is predominantly mottled light beige in colour. The mantle edge is extensively folded as in other Doriprismatica and Glossodoris species with coloured lines at the edge. There is a transition from beige to yellow, followed by a line which is pale blue and then an outer black line in this species.

References

Chromodorididae
Gastropods described in 2018